Q61 may refer to:
 Q61 (New York City bus)
 , an auxiliary ship of the Argentine Navy
 As-Saff, the 61st surah of the Quran
 Georgetown Airport (California), in El Dorado County, California, United States
 , a patrol vessel of the Qatari Emiri Navy